Carmen Buell is an American Democratic politician from Greenfield, Massachusetts. She represented the 2nd Franklin district in the Massachusetts House of Representatives from 1985 to 1993.

See also
 1985-1986 Massachusetts legislature
 1987-1988 Massachusetts legislature
 1989-1990 Massachusetts legislature
 1991-1992 Massachusetts legislature

References

Year of birth missing
Year of death missing
Members of the Massachusetts House of Representatives
Women state legislators in Massachusetts
20th-century American women politicians
20th-century American politicians
People from Greenfield, Massachusetts